Neeley is an unincorporated community in Power County, Idaho, United States.

See also

References

Unincorporated communities in Power County, Idaho
Unincorporated communities in Idaho